The BTR-40 (БТР, from Бронетранспортёр, or Bronetransporter, literally "armoured transporter".†) is a Soviet non-amphibious, wheeled armoured personnel carrier and reconnaissance vehicle. It is often referred to as the Sorokovka in Soviet service. It is also the first mass-produced Soviet APC. It was eventually replaced in the APC role by the BTR-152 and in the scout car role by the BRDM-1.

Development history
The BTR-40's development began in early 1947 at the design bureau of the Gorkovsky Avtomobilny Zavod (Gorkovsky Automobile Factory) under the leadership of V. A. Dedkov. The concept was a successor to the BA-64B armoured car which went out of production in 1946. The design team also included L. W. Kostikin and P.I. Muziukin. Two prototypes designated BTR-141 were completed in 1947. The first was armed with two coaxial 14.5 mm KPVT heavy machine guns on a rotatable mount which was protected by armour plate at the front and sides. The second had no fixed armament. Neither one was accepted for service. In 1950 two new prototypes were produced. Those had a different shape of armour including an upright rear armour. Again one prototype had no fixed armament and the second was armed with two coaxial 14.5 mm KPVT heavy machine guns. These were accepted into service as BTR-40 and BTR-40A respectively.

The vehicle's drawbacks, such as its poor cross-country performance and problems with crossing water obstacles, compelled the design team to produce, in late 1954, what was planned to be an amphibious variant of the BTR-40. It received the designation BTR-40P (with the 'P' standing for plavayushchiy – "floating"). During the design process, the vehicle moved away from the APC concept and became an amphibious armoured scout car. It received a new designation, BRDM.

Description

Overview
The BTR-40's design was based on the GAZ-63 four wheel drive truck which went into production in 1946. The design featured a self-bearing body which was a new feature in Soviet vehicles. The hull has two side doors for the commander and driver and a back door. The vehicle can transport up to eight fully equipped soldiers or 1 tonne of cargo.

Protection
The BTR-40's armour is from 6 mm to 8 mm thick which gives it protection from small arms fire and the shell splinters of its time, but does not protect it against modern artillery fragments and .50-calibre machine gun fire. The BTR-40-series tyres are not protected by armour. They are particularly vulnerable to puncture from fire of all kinds. The vehicle has no roof and is normally covered with a tarpaulin to protect the crew, transported cargo or troops from rain and snow. However this makes it unable to mount any of the SGMB machine guns.

Armament
The APC variant has no permanent armament but it has pintle mounts for three 7.62 mm SGMB medium machine guns, one at the front of the troop compartment and the other two at the sides. The vehicle also has two firing ports on both sides of the hull which allow up to four soldiers to use their weapons while being protected by the APC's armour.

Maneuverability
Like the GAZ-63 truck on which it is based on, the BTR-40 has a four-wheel drive. The chassis, however, is shorter compared to the GAZ-63. The only other thing that distinguishes the chassis of the BTR-40 from that of the GAZ-63 are additional shock absorbers. The BTR-40 also has a more powerful engine. The turning angle is 7.5 m.

Equipment
The vehicle has the 10RT-12 receiving and airing radio which has a range of 20–25 km and a winch at the front, with a maximum capacity of 4.5 tonnes and 70 m of cable. It has no protection against nuclear, biological and chemical (NBC) weapons. It also has no night vision equipment.

Service history

Soviet Union

The BTR-40 was produced at the Gorkovsky Avtomobilny Zavod (Gorkovsky Automobile Factory) from 1950 to 1960. It was first shown publicly at the military parade in Moscow in 1950. It was issued to the Red Army in 1950 and was used in the APC, reconnaissance and command post roles. After several years of service, it became apparent that it did not fit the modern battlefield. It was replaced by the BTR-152.

Foreign service
The BTR-40 began to enter service with two other Warsaw Pact members in late 1949, namely East Germany and Poland, where it was used as a standard APC until more advanced vehicles like the BTR-152 were available. The last BTR-40s were withdrawn from Warsaw Pact countries in the early 1970s. The vehicle was also sold to many Arab and African nations in the late 1950s and early 1960s.

The People's Republic of China (PRC), had developed a copy of the BTR-40 called the Type 55. It is unknown how many of these vehicles entered service with the PLA. The vehicle was also exported to North Korea, probably as part of a military assistance programme during the Korean War, where it saw combat for the first time. It was later used by the North Vietnamese Army during the Vietnam War.

BTR-40 also saw combat service during the North Yemen Civil War during which at least one was captured from the Egyptians by the royalist guerrillas.

List of conflicts

 1956 – Hungarian Revolution of 1956 (Soviet Union)
 1955–1975 – Vietnam War (Vietnam)
 1962-1970 – North Yemen Civil War (Egypt)
 1966–1991 – South African Border War (Angola, Cuba)
 1967 – Six-Day War (Egypt, Syria)
 1968 – Soviet invasion of Czechoslovakia (Soviet Union)
 1969 – Sino-Soviet border conflict (Soviet Union)
 1970–1975 Cambodian Civil War (Cambodia)
 1973 – Yom Kippur War (Egypt, Syria)
 1974–1991 – Ethiopian Civil War
 1961–1991 – Eritrean War for Independence
 1975–1990 – Lebanese Civil War
 1975–1991 – Western Sahara War (Polisario)
 1975–2002 – Angolan Civil War (Angola)
 1977–1978 – Ogaden War (Somalia)
 1978–1987 – Chadian–Libyan conflict
 1979–1988 – Soviet–Afghan War (Soviet Union, Afghanistan)
 1980–1988 – Iran-Iraq War (Iran)
 1982 – 1982 Ethiopian–Somali Border War
 2003–2005 – Insurgency in Aceh (Indonesia)

Variants

Soviet Union

 BTR-141 (1947) – The original prototype with a faceted rear hull had two variants. The first was armed with twin ZPTU-2 14.5 mm KPV heavy machine guns placed in a rotary platform with armour protection at the front and sides. The second version had no permanent armament but later became the BTR-40.
 BTR-40 (1950) – Original production model.
 BTR-40A (1950) – BTR-40 converted into a SPAAG armed with twin ZPTU-2 14.5 mm twin anti-aircraft gun (2400 rounds) in a turret, later also used in the BTR-152A, manually operated by a single soldier. The turret is placed inside the troop compartment. It can make a full turn and its guns can elevate between -5 and +80 degrees. This variant does not have the firing ports in the hull sides.
 BTR-40V (1956) – BTR-40 fitted with an external tyre pressure regulation system.
 BTR-40B (1957) – BTR-40V with an armoured roof with four hatches. The vehicle has a filtering/ventilation system, NBC protection system and central tyre pressure regulation system. It also has a pintle mount for a 12.7 mm or 14.5 mm heavy machine gun, although the standard version of the BTR-40B had no fixed armament. It was designed for use as a reconnaissance vehicle. Crew was reduced from 2 + 8 passengers to 2 + 6.
 BTR-40Kh – NBC reconnaissance vehicle.
 BTR-40ZhD (1959) – BTR-40 equipped with small rail wheels mounted to the front and rear of the vehicle on special supports.
 BRDM-1 – Armoured car which uses a number of BTR-40 components. Originally planned to be an amphibious variant of the BTR-40 and therefore it received the designation BTR-40P.

The People's Republic of China
 Type 55 – Chinese copy of the BTR-40. Possibly also a designation for the Soviet-supplied BTR-40s.

Cuba
 BTR-40A-AA – A Cuban air defence vehicle. It uses the chassis and the armoured front of the BTR-40 but the troop compartment has been removed in favour of a square sided platform mount with drop down sides and rear on which twin ZPTU-2 14.5 mm KPV heavy machine guns are placed.
 BTR-40A-PB – A Cuban BTR-40 armed with an anti-tank guided missile (ATGM) launcher. While travelling, the launcher is hidden in the superstructure so that from a distance, the vehicle cannot be easily distinguished from a normal BTR-40. The superstructure also provides the launcher with armour protection. When in position, the roof of the superstructure is opened sideways and the launcher is elevated.
 Jababli – Is a Cuban BTR-40 fitted with a 3M11 Falanga (AT-2 Swatter) ATGM launcher on a launch platform in a cut-down superstructure. Only a limited number were built. NATO gave it the designation M1975/4.

East Germany
 SPW-40 – The East German designation for a BTR-40.
 SPW-40A – The East German designation for a BTR-40A.
 SPW-40Ch – The East German designation for a BTR-40Kh.
 SPW-40 converted into a tank destroyer armed with an elevatable ATGM launcher capable of firing six 9M14 Malyutka ATGMs with an armoured roof over it in a cut down troop compartment. This variant does not have the firing ports in the hull sides.

Indonesia

 BTR-40 converted into an armoured car armed with a medium machine gun in a cube-shaped turret on top of the superstructure inside the troop compartment. It also has four smoke grenade launchers on both sides of the hull.
 BTR-40 converted into an armoured car armed with a 40 mm gun in an angular turret on top of the superstructure inside the troop compartment, it also has four smoke grenade dischargers on both sides of the hull. It has a searchlight on the left hand side of the hull. It is intended to be used for fire support.

Israel
 BTR-40 fitted with pintle mounts for the US M1919A4 7.62mm light machine guns, one in the forward part of the troop compartment and two on either side as well a large number of equipment holders on the hull.
 BTR-40 fitted with TCM-20 anti-aircraft turret.

Operators

Current operators
 : 20
: 100
: 380; 350 BTR-40 and 30 SPW-40Ch
: 100
: 16
: 15
: 100; 85 operational.

: 10
: 15
: 20
: 450
: 200
: Type 55 variant.
: 100

Former operators
: 32
: 3
: 100
: 100
: 150
: Unlicensed variant designed Type 55; retired in the 1990s.
: 20; Type 55 variant.
: 300
: 200
: Used by the Israeli Border Police.
: 200

: 400
: 60

: 60
: 70
: 60
: 40

See also
 BRDM-1
 BTR-152

References

External links

 BTR-40 foto and forum
 globalsecurity.org
  Description and photo gallery at armoured.vif2.ru
  Description and photo gallery at legion.wplus.net
 Website and Pictures

Armoured personnel carriers of the Soviet Union
Armoured personnel carriers of the Cold War
Cold War armoured fighting vehicles of the Soviet Union
GAZ Group military vehicles
Wheeled reconnaissance vehicles
Military vehicles introduced in the 1950s
Reconnaissance vehicles of the Cold War
Wheeled armoured personnel carriers
Rail and road vehicle